Christos Ampos (19 October 1937 – 1 July 2020) was a  Greek footballer who played as a forward.

Club career
Ampos started playing football in 1953 at AO Kifisia, which was then competing in the second division of Athens. At the same time, he worked hard in a textile factory in the area and went to school. He mainly played as a left winger. He was very fast with a powerful left shot and he could score goals with headers, while many times he scored by launching power shots from a long distance. His playing style was characterized by stubbornness and combativeness.

In 1956 he was signed by AEK Athens and he continued to work at the factory and to be consistent with his obligations with his team, even saving up and buying a motorcycle to go from his job in Nea Filadelfeia for training. His goal wasn't enough for his team to win the championship on 31 July 1960, as Panathinaikos turned the game in the eventual 2–1 for the play-off at Karaiskakis Stadium. He remained at AEK as one of their main players until 1962.

He later moved to Australia to play for the Greek-based club, Alexander the Great, until a car accident made ended his football career.

International career
Ampos also played with both Greek U19 and the military team.

Personal life
For several years after his retirement Ampos was employed at the swimming pool of Glyfada. He died on 1 July 2020, at the age of 82.

References

1937 births
2020 deaths
A.E. Kifisia F.C. players
AEK Athens F.C. players
Super League Greece players
Association football forwards
Greek footballers
Expatriate soccer players in Australia
People from Mytilene
Sportspeople from the North Aegean